Sarkhej is a suburban neighbourhood in the city of Ahmedabad. It is primarily known for the Sarkhej Roza, an architectural complex located 8 km south from the city centre. One of the most important roads of metropolitan Ahmedabad, Sarkhej–Gandhinagar Highway, originates from Sarkhej and ends at the twin city Gandhinagar.

History
Mainly erected under Mahmud Begada's reign (1442–51), it has been built on the location where the holy man and religious Muslim leader Ahmed Khattu Ganj Baksh (or Shaikh Ahmad Khattri) lived and died (in 1446). He was the spiritual guide of the sultan Ahmed Shah.
He is said to have been one of the fourth Ahmed who founded the city of Ahmedabad. 
His Roza or Maqbara is one of the biggest mausoleum of India, competing with the Taj Mahal.
The complex became a retreat place for sultans and later an imperial necropolis.

Organized around a large artificial water reservoir are to be found gardens, a mosque and the holy man's tomb, together with the tombs of Mahmud Begada and his wife Rajabai, as well as palaces, a harem and pavilions.
The buildings have an austere beauty, a mixture of Hindu and Islamic styles.

Location
Sarkhej is accessible through National Highways NH 8A and NH 8C and the Sardar Patel Ring Road.

Sarkhej is an important godown area for Ahmedabad. Warehousing and Distribution for entire Gujarat is done from Sarkhej. Sarkhej has a meter gauge Railway Station (SEJ).

Public Transport 
The Gujarat State Road Transport Corporation runs a circular bus service along the Sardar Patel Ring Road from Sarkhej on an hourly basis.

References 

Neighbourhoods in Ahmedabad
Archaeological sites in Gujarat